Bubalornis is a genus of bird in the family Ploceidae. Established by Andrew Smith in 1836, it contains the following species:

The name Bubalornis is a combination of the Greek words boubalos, meaning "buffalo" and ornis, meaning "bird". The genus got its name from the buffalo weavers' habit of following herds of African Buffalo.

References

External links

 
Bird genera
Ploceidae
Taxonomy articles created by Polbot